The 2014 Hampden–Sydney Tigers football team represented Hampden–Sydney College in the 2014 NCAA Division III football season. It was the Tiger's 120th overall, the 39th as a member of the Old Dominion Athletic Conference. The team was led by Marty Favret, in his fifteenth year as head coach, and played its home games at Lewis C. Everett Stadium in Death Valley, Hampden–Sydney, Virginia. They finished the season 7–4, 5–2 in ODAC play to finish in first place in the conference. They received an automatic bid to the Division III Playoffs where they lost to #4 Wesley in the first round.

Personnel

Coaching staff

Roster

Schedule

Game summaries

Wabash

Source: 

The Tigers' opened the 2014 season on the road against Wabash, who they lost to in Crawfordsville, Indiana 20–40. The game was the inaugural playing of the "Gentlemen's Classic", a match-up between both all-men's colleges. Hampden–Sydney hit the scoreboard first, using a 60-yard strike from Nash Nance to Holton Walker to go up 7–0 on its second possession. The Little Giants scored quickly, using 11 plays on a 69-yard drive that led to Tyler Holmes four-yard run. After traded punts, Hampden-Sydney took its fourth drive into the second quarter, and finished off a six play drive with Nance scoring on a goal line push.

The Tiger defense forced a three-and-out on the ensuing drive, but four plays later, Ethan Buresh picked off Nance and returned the turnover 41 yards for the game-tying touchdown. Wabash's defense then forced a punt from the Tigers on the next drive, which was downed at the Wabash 49-yard line. Wabash drove to the red zone but the Tiger defense held and forced a 39-yard field goal from Andrew Tutsie to give the Little Giants a 17–14 lead going into halftime.

The Little Giants controlled the third quarter, scoring ten points while possessing the ball for just over 13 minutes. The Tigers, behind Freddie Potter, had a fourth-and-one stop on Wabash's first drive, but the Little Giants scored a touchdown on its second drive – a 26-yard touchdown pass from Michael Putko to Houston Hodges. Hampden–Sydney fumbled on its next drive, and Wabash capitalized with a 29-yard field goal from Tutsie. Wabash again scored on its first drive of the fourth quarter, going up 34–14 while driving 68 yards in 11 plays. Two drives later, the Tigers scored again, with Walker catching his second touchdown of the day, this time from 34 yards out.

Christopher Newport

Source:

Coast Guard

Source:

Catholic

Source:

Washington & Lee

Source:

Emory & Henry

Source:

Shenandoah

Source:

Bridgewater

Source:

Guilford

Source:

Randolph–Macon

Source:

Wesley

Source:

Ranking movements

After the season

Awards
After the end of the regular season, multiple Hampden–Sydney players were recognized for their on-field performance with a variety of recognitions. The ODAC recognized several players for their individual performances with various awards. On November 25, 2014, senior receiver Holton Walker, senior linebacker Josh Doggett, and senior defensive back John Moore were all selected to the ODAC First Team. Earning Second Team honors were senior quarterback Nash Nance, junior offensive lineman P.J. Melnick, senior defensive lineman Freddie Potter, senior linebacker Robert Stack, and junior defensive back Sidney Henry. Additionally, senior slot receiver Joey Kernan, senior tight end Joey Druhan, and senior place kicker Max Antwerpes earned Third Team accolades.

On December 3, 2014, the Touchdown Club of Richmond announced its player of the year awards for each football position, awarded to the best players from all of Division II, Division III, the NAIA and the USCAA in the Commonwealth of Virginia. Two Tigers won player of the year awards: Holton Walker for best wide receiver and Josh Doggett for best linebacker.

On December 10, 2014, Nash Nance was awarded The Lanier Award (named in honor of Willie Lanier), which is presented annually to the top football player in either Division II or Division III in the Commonwealth of Virginia. Nance was the first Hampden–Sydney athlete to win the award since Drew Smith was named the top player in the Commonwealth in 2007.

References

Hampden–Sydney
Hampden–Sydney Tigers football seasons
Hampden–Sydney
Hampden–Sydney Tigers football